Mohammad Reza Mohajeri is an Iranian football manager.
Mohajeri started his coaching career at Shirin Faraz in 2011.

Honours

Manager honours
Siah Jamegan
Azadegan League (1): 2014–15
Azadegan League (Runner-up Group A) (1): 2013–14 
Second Division (1): 2012–13

References

Living people
Iranian football managers
1964 births
Shahr Khodro F.C. managers
People from Mashhad
F.C. Nassaji Mazandaran managers
Persian Gulf Pro League managers